Mount Alexander Road (and its northern section as Bulla Road) is a major road in Melbourne's inner northern suburbs, connecting the northern edges of the city district to just south of Essendon Airport. It was named after its original destination: the Gold Fields of Mount Alexander, now known as Castlemaine.

Route
The road starts as Bulla Road, outside the entrance to the Essendon Airport retail park, crossing Tullamarine Freeway and CityLink to the elongated roundabout where Keilor and Lincoln Roads meet in Essendon. It changes name to Mount Alexander Road and continues heading south to Moonee Ponds as a wide dual-carriageway with a plantation separating northbound and southbound traffic, until it reaches the intersection with Pascoe Vale and Ascot Vale Roads at Moonee Ponds Junction. It continues south as a four-lane single-carriageway road, sharing tram tracks along the roadway through Ascot Vale, then forming the boundary between Flemington and Travancore, before eventually crossing Moonee Ponds Creek underneath the CityLink sound-tube and arriving at the intersection with the CityLink ramps, Boundary and Flemington Roads in Parkville.

Melbourne tram route 59 runs along the majority of the road, sharing traffic lanes with motor vehicles between Flemington Road and Moonee Ponds Junction, and along reserved tracks between Fletcher Street and Keilor Road in Essendon. Essendon tram depot is also located on the road, in the suburb of Travancore.

History
Mount Alexander Road originally ran north from Flemington Road in Parkville to Pascoe Vale Road at Moonee Ponds Junction. The Country Roads Board (later VicRoads) declared a northern extension to the existing allocation as a Main Road in the 1959/60 financial year, from Moonee Ponds Junction to the intersection with Bendigo Road (today Keilor Road) and Sunbury Road (today Bulla Road) in northern Essendon.

Mount Alexander Road linked Bendigo Road (and the Calder Highway beyond) to central Melbourne, and was signed as National Route 79 between Essendon and Parkville in 1955; once the Tullamarine Freeway extension to Parkville opened in 1970 and National Route 79 was re-routed onto the new freeway, the old route was replaced with Alternative National Route 79, until it was removed in 1989. Bulla Road was allocated Metro Route 37, extended north from Lincoln Road to Tullamarine Freeway, when the Tullamarine Freeway extension opened in 1970, replacing former Metropolitan Route 40.

The passing of the Road Management Act 2004 granted the responsibility of overall management and development of Victoria's major arterial roads to VicRoads: in 2004, VicRoads re-declared Mount Alexander Road (Arterial #5824) from Flemington Road in Parkville to the ramps of the "Western Link Tollway" (CityLink's Western link) in Strathmore, south of Essendon Airport; this declaration formally includes today's Bulla Road, but signposts along this section have kept its original name.

Major intersections
Mount Alexander Road is entirely contained within the City of Moonee Valley local government area.

Gallery

See also

References

Streets in Melbourne
Essendon, Victoria
Transport in the City of Moonee Valley
Flemington, Victoria